Chikballapur Assembly constituency is one of the 224 constituencies in the Karnataka Legislative Assembly of Karnataka a south state of India. It is a part of Chikballapur Lok Sabha constituency.

Members of Legislative Assembly
 1985 : A. Muniyappa (IND)
2008 : K P Bachegowda
2013 : Dr K Sudhakar (INC)
 2018 : Dr. K. Sudhakar (INC)

Election results

1985 Assembly Election
 A. Muniyappa (IND) : 40,751 votes  
 Renuka Rajendran (INC) : 21,823

2018 Assembly Election
 Dr. K. Sudhakar (INC) : 82006 votes 
 K.P.Bachegowda (JD-S) : 51575

2019 Assembly Bypoll Election

See also
 List of constituencies of Karnataka Legislative Assembly

References

Assembly constituencies of Karnataka
Belagavi district